The hooded tinamou (Nothocercus nigrocapillus) is a type of ground bird found in forests of Bolivia and Peru.

Taxonomy
Tinamou are from the family Tinamidae, and in the larger scheme are also ratites.  Unlike other ratites, tinamous can fly, although in general, they are not strong fliers. Ratites evolved from prehistoric flying birds, and tinamous are the closest living relative of these birds.
 
The hooded tinamou has two subspecies:
 N. n. cadwaladeri occurs in the Andes of northwestern Peru.
 N. n. nigrocapillus occurs in the Andes of central Peru and Bolivia.

Habitat and range
The hooded tinamou is found in montane moist forest up to  altitude. This species is native to the Andes in Bolivia and Peru.

Description
Hooded tinamou is light brown above and narrowly freckled with black in color.

Behavior
Like other tinamous, the hooded tinamou eats fruit off the ground or low-lying bushes.  They also eat small amounts of invertebrates, flower buds, tender leaves, seeds, and roots. The male incubates the eggs which may come from as many as 4 different females, and then will raise them until they are ready to be on their own, usually 2–3 weeks. The nest is located on the ground in dense brush or between raised root buttresses.

Conservation

Footnotes

References

External links
 Hooded Tinamou videos, photos & sounds on the Internet Bird Collection.

hooded tinamou
Tinamous of South America
Birds of the Peruvian Andes
Birds of the Bolivian Andes
hooded tinamou
hooded tinamou